Athlone Community College is a mixed gender school in the town of Athlone in the Irish Midlands. Athlone Community College consists of a student body of over 1,300 students and employs more than 120 teachers.

History

Prior to the development of the present co-educational system, the Sisters of Mercy opened the school for girls in 1893, leading to the expansion and introduction of Technical education. However, fund-raising was necessary and the Sisters organized several concerts to clear an IR£1,500.00 debt. The noted tenor, John McCormack, was a frequent performer and helped alleviate some of the Sisters financial difficulties.

In 1902, a Technical School for boys was opened by the Secretary of the Department of Education and Technical Instruction. In 1906, the committee set up the Athlone Woodworking and Industries Society offering their premises and equipment in Gleeson Street to the Society. In 1930, the technical scheme that had up to this been administered as a local scheme, now joined the wider county scheme. New premises were acquired in St. Mary's Place. Classes commenced and as numbers increased further extensions to the building were required.

Eventually greater accommodation was necessary and in 1974 the work and students of the Old Vocational School transferred to a new building at Retreat Road where the present Community College stands.

In 2006, the Department of Education & Science gave approval for the building of a new school in place of the existing building. The school was completed in 2014 and opened by the Taoiseach in 2017.

Achievements
The Athlone Community college has had a number of achievements in sports, debating, science and literature since its opening.

The school enters the Concern Debating Competition and the Mental Health Public Speaking Competition every year. Athlone Community College has won the Concern Debating competition three times and it was the outright winner of the Mental Health Public Speaking Competition in 2010. In addition the school enter teams into the Gael Linn Irish debating competition every year. It has been runner up in the All-Ireland on several occasions.

The School is also a Prime School in the Area of Green Schools having been awarded 4 Green Flags. They have a strong committee and the organisation is well respected and known through out the school. The school has also won multiple green schools awards for Litter and Waste and Travel. 

Athlone Community College is the sole community college to have won a Leinster 'A' Senior Colleges title in Gaelic football, doing so in 2008.

In association football (soccer) the school won U14 and U16 Leinster & All-Ireland titles (in 2005 and 2006 respectively), and were finalists in the U16 and U18 Leinster Champions League Finalists (in 2007 and 2008).

The college is also involved in rugby, hurling, hockey, athletics, and equestrian sports.

References

External links
 https://web.archive.org/web/20071118172347/http://athlonecc.ie/index.htm

Buildings and structures in Athlone
Community College, Athlone
Westmeath
Secondary schools in County Westmeath
1974 establishments in Ireland
Educational institutions established in 1974